The 1997–98 season was Fulham's 100th season in professional football. They played in the Second Division (previously known as the Third Division).

Season summary
Manager Micky Adams was sacked in September, soon after Mohammed Al Fayed's take-over. Ray Wilkins and Kevin Keegan were appointed as head coach and director of football respectively. The club managed to make the play-offs despite losing their last three games, but this wasn't good enough for Al Fayed, who sacked Wilkins and promoted Keegan to his position. Keegan was unable to navigate Fulham through the play-offs as they were defeated by Grimsby Town 2–1 on aggregate (1–1 and 1–0 over two legs) in the semi-finals.

Final league table

Results
Fulham's score comes first

Legend

Football League Second Division

Second Division play-offs

FA Cup

League Cup

Football League Trophy

Players

First-team squad

Transfers

In

Out

Transfers in:  £7,473,000
Transfers out:  £295,000
Total spending:  £7,178,000

References

Notes

External links
Fulham website
Soccerbase - Results archive

Fulham F.C. seasons
Fulham